is a jazz composer, Hammond B-3 organist and pianist from Osaka, Japan.

She was born in Osaka. Her parents bought her a small organ when she was three and she started learning to play standards. At high school, she listened to Hammond B3 players including 
Jimmy Smith, then Charles Earland, Jack McDuff, Jimmy McGriff and Dr. Lonnie Smith.

A graduate of the Osaka College of Music, she has resided in New York City since 2001. After moving to the US, she had lessons from Lonnie Smith.

In addition to her solo work, she plays as a sideman in various groups in New York. She has accompanied Lou Donaldson since 2007.

Discography

 Harlem Dreams with Grady Tate (2004, M & I)
 Sweet and Funky (2006, M & I; 2007, 18th & Vine; 2018, AT Records)
 St. Louis Blues (2007, Mojo)
 NYC Serenade with Jimmy Cobb (2008, Mojo)
 Oriental Express (2009, 18th & Vine)
 Sakura (2011, 1-2-3-4 GO; American Showplace Music)
 Commencement with Jeff Hamilton and John Hart (2014, Somethin' Cool; AT Records)
 Pelham Parkway by Kevin Golden Trio (2016, Kevin Golden Productions)
 So Cute, So Bad with Jeff Hamilton and Graham Dechter (2017, Somethin' Cool; AT Records)
 Pride & Joy by Lioness [all female group] (2019, Posi-Tone Records)
 Equal Time with Jeff Hamilton and Graham Dechter (2019, Capri Records)

See also
Hammond organ
Organ trio

References

External links
 Akiko Tsuruga's official website

Year of birth missing (living people)
21st-century organists
21st-century Japanese women musicians
Japanese jazz organists
Japanese women organists
Living people
Musicians from Osaka